The 2008 European Mixed Team Badminton Championships were held in Herning, Denmark, from April 12 to April 15, and were organised by the Badminton Europe and the Danmarks Badminton Forbund.

The competition was followed by the 2008 European Badminton Championships, the singles competition, held between April 16 and April 19.

Medalists

Results

Groups

Group A

Group B

Group C

Group D

Knockout stage

Final

External links
Badminton Europe: 2008 European Mixed Team Championships
TournamentSoftware: European Mixed Team Championships 2008

European Mixed Team Badminton Championships
European Mixed Team Badminton Championships
Badminton tournaments in Denmark
B
Sport in Herning